This is a list of United States Air Force air defence squadrons. The list provides the squadron name, shield and the location of its installation.

See also
List of United States Air Force squadrons

Air Defense